Gryazi is a town and the administrative center of Gryazinsky District in Lipetsk Oblast, Russia, located on the Matyra River (left tributary of the Voronezh; Don's basin)  southeast of Lipetsk, the administrative center of the oblast. Population:

History
It was founded in the second half of the 19th century as a settlement around the Gryazi railway station, which was opened in 1868. Town status was granted to it in 1938.

Administrative and municipal status
Within the framework of administrative divisions, Gryazi serves as the administrative center of Gryazinsky District. As an administrative division, it is incorporated within Gryazinsky District as Gryazi Town Under District Jurisdiction. As a municipal division, Gryazi Town Under District Jurisdiction is incorporated within Gryazinsky Municipal District as Gryazi Urban Settlement.

References

Notes

Sources

External links
Official website of Gryazi 
Gryazi Business Directory  

Cities and towns in Lipetsk Oblast
Lipetsky Uyezd